Pramac Racing is a motorcycle racing team competing in the MotoGP and MotoE World Championships. The team was created in 2002 by Italian company Pramac. In 2005 Pramac Racing joined forces with Spanish d'Antin MotoGP to form "Pramac d'Antin" and in 2007 the team became part of the Pramac Group. After Luis d'Antin left the team in 2008, the team became known as "Pramac Racing". Their base is in United Kingdom.

History

d'Antin MotoGP
The d'Antin MotoGP Team was created in 1999 by Spanish former motorcycle racer Luis d'Antin and was based in Madrid. Beginning in  the team raced in the 250 cc Spanish and World Championships with Yamaha bikes and Spanish riders Fonsi Nieto and David García. In the same season the team ran in the 500 cc class with Japanese rider Norifumi Abe aboard a Yamaha YZR500. A podium finish was the team's best result.

In  the 500 cc class became MotoGP and the D'Antin team continued with the same riders and the same Yamaha YZR500. The 500 cc 2-stroke motorcycle was not able to compete against the more powerful 990 cc 4-strokes and top 10 finishes were the team's best results. The team switched to Ducati motorcycles in  using the previous season's Desmosedici GP3 and signing  Superbike World Champion Neil Hodgson and runner-up Rubén Xaus, Ducati's factory riders for the 2003 World Superbike Championship season. The team ran into financial difficulties mid-season and was not able to run a test program; their best result was a third place for Xaus in Qatar.

Pramac Racing
Pramac Racing entered MotoGP in 2002, taking over the activities of Hardwick Racing, relocating to Italy and using the Honda NSR500 with Tetsuya Harada as a rider. In September 2002 Pramac signed a three-year deal with Max Biaggi and Honda Racing Corporation to enter a Honda RC211V.
Two months later Pramac and Pons Racing reached an agreement whereby Biaggi would have competed for Pons while still under contract with Pramac.

In 2003 Pramac also entered his own team with a Honda RC211V for Makoto Tamada, being the only Honda team to use Bridgestone tyres. A podium in Brazil was the team's best result, while Biaggi scored two wins and finished the championship in third place.

For 2004 Pramac Racing ran alongside Pons Racing under the name Camel Honda. Tamada and his team, led by Luca Montiron, joined Sito Pons' structure. Tamada still raced on Bridgestone tyres while Biaggi used Michelin tyres. Tamada finished the season with two wins and sixth place in the final championship standings; Biaggi clinched a win and the third place overall. Many changes happened at the end of the season: Biaggi terminated his contract with Pramac and joined the Repsol Honda works team, Luca Montiron also left the team and founded JiR with Tamada as a rider while Pramac ended its relationship with Pons Racing to start a new project with Ducati and d'Antin.

Pramac d'Antin
In 2005 d'Antin MotoGP and Pramac Racing merged to form Pramac d'Antin. The team used the previous season's Desmosedici GP4 with Italian Roberto Rolfo as a rider. The team used Dunlop tyres and usually finished races near the back of the grid. For 2006 the team was given use of the Desmosedici GP6. the same motorcycles the factory team was using. Alex Hofmann and José Luis Cardoso were the team's riders. The Dunlop tyres the team used were not competitive and once again the team finished races near the back of the grid.

Prior to the start of the 2007 season, Pramac and d'Antin reached an agreement that saw the d'Antin team becoming an integral part of the Pramac Group. The team used the new 800 cc Ducati Desmosedici GP7 and Bridgestone tyres, and Brazilian Alex Barros joined the team alongside Alex Hofmann. Barros had a strong season finishing regularly in the top ten and taking a podium finish at the Italian Grand Prix, beating works rider Casey Stoner into fourth place. Hofmann had a more average season and he injured his hand in practice at Mazda Raceway Laguna Seca. He was replaced by Chaz Davies for the remainder of the weekend, and by Iván Silva at Brno. Hofmann returned to racing at Misano but he was fired by the team following the Portuguese Grand Prix, after pulling out of the race while in with a chance of scoring points, due to a lack of motivation. Davies returned to complete the season.

Alice Team
In 2008, the team continued using the Ducati Desmosedici GP8 and Bridgestone tyres. Sylvain Guintoli and Toni Elías were the team's riders, while the team was sponsored by Alice – Telecom Italia's DSL service – and was renamed the Alice Team. Luis d'Antin resigned from the team midway though the 2008 season, at the German Grand Prix at the Sachsenring.

Pramac Racing
For the 2009 season, the team competed under the name of Pramac Racing, using the Ducati Desmosedici GP9 and Bridgestone tyres with Mika Kallio and Niccolò Canepa as the team's riders. On 19 August 2009 it was announced Aleix Espargaró would race for Pramac in Indianapolis and Misano, the seat having been filled by Michel Fabrizio at Brno. He temporarily replaced Kallio who in turn filled in 
for  Casey Stoner at the Ducati works team. Kallio and Espargaró raced for Pramac for the 2010 season.

The Pramac team competed in the  championship with riders Loris Capirossi and Randy de Puniet and achieving a sixth place as a best race result. Damian Cudlin and Sylvain Guintoli entered some races replacing an injured Capirossi. In  Pramac Racing fielded only one bike for Héctor Barberá. For 2013, Pramac Racing received Factory supported team Ducati status and fielded two factory-specification Desmosedici for works riders Andrea Iannone and Ben Spies. Spies was injured for all but the first two races of that season and was replaced by Michele Pirro and later Yonny Hernández, who ended up securing a ride for the team in the  season alongside the confirmed Iannone. During 2014 Iannone still raced a factory-supported GP14 bike, while Hernandez rode a GP13 bike.

For  Iannone was promoted to the factory Ducati team, to replace Cal Crutchlow. Iannone was replaced by Danilo Petrucci at Pramac. Hernández retained with the team, both of them were riding with the Ducati Desmosedici GP14. In 2016, Scott Redding joined the team. Petrucci retained with the team, both of them were riding with the Ducati Desmosedici GP15.

In , the Pramac team received a factory-specification Ducati Desmosedici for Petrucci - as his championship standing was ahead from Redding in 2016 - while Redding riding with a one-year old Ducati Desmosedici. In , Jack Miller joined the team to replacing Redding, who was moved to the Aprilia Racing Team Gresini. As usual, Petrucci riding with GP18 bike while Miller riding with GP17 bike.

In  Petrucci was promoted to the factory Ducati team, to replace Jorge Lorenzo. Petrucci was replaced by Francesco Bagnaia - the 2018 Moto2 World Champion - at Pramac. Miller was promoted to riding a Ducati Desmosedici GP19, whilst Bagnaia riding with a Ducati Desmosedici GP18. For , for the first time since 2013, the Pramac Racing fielded two factory-specification Ducati Desmosedici GP20 bike for works riders Miller and Bagnaia - both riders are riding with the same bike for the first time since 2016.

For , Johann Zarco and Jorge Martín joined the team after their last season with Esponsorama Racing and Moto2 respectively. Both riders riding the new Ducati Desmosedici GP21. The team scored its first ever premier class victory at the Styrian GP by Jorge Martin.

MotoGP results

By rider

By season

(key) (Races in bold indicate pole position; races in italics indicate fastest lap)

Notes

References

External links
 

Motorcycle racing teams
Motorcycle racing teams established in 1999
1999 establishments in Spain